The 2011–12 Irish Cup (known as the JJB Sports Irish Cup for sponsorship reasons) was the cup's 132nd edition since its introduction. The competition began on 17 September 2011 with the first round and ended on 5 May 2012 with the final.

Linfield were the defending champions, after a 2–1 victory over Crusaders in last season's final. The two clubs met again in this season's final, and Linfield successfully defended the cup to win it for the sixth time in seven seasons after defeating Crusaders 4–1. Crusaders qualified for the first qualifying round of the 2012–13 UEFA Europa League as Linfield had already qualified for the UEFA Champions League by winning the 2011–12 IFA Premiership.

Results

First round
The draw for the first round was held on 1 September 2011. Ards Rangers, Broomhedge, Lower Maze, Newington Youth Club, Rathfriland Rangers and Sirocco Works all received a bye into the Second Round. Matches were played on 17 and 24 September 2011.

|}
Source: irishfa.com

Second round
The games were played on 22 October 2011.

|}
Source: irishfa.com

Third round
The games were played on 19 November 2011.

|}
Source: irishfa.com

Fourth round
All 30 clubs from IFA Championship 1 and 2 entered the competition at this stage, as well as the 10 lower league clubs that had progressed through the previous rounds. The games were played on 10 and 17 December 2011.

|}
Source: irishfa.com

Fifth round
The draw for the Fifth Round was made on 14 December 2011. All 12 clubs from the IFA Premiership entered at this stage, along with the 20 winners from the fourth round matches. The games were played on 14 January 2012. Replays were played on 24 January 2012.

|-
|colspan="3" style="background:#E8FFD8;"|Replays

|}
Source: irishfa.com

Sixth Round
The games were played on 11 February 2012.

|-
|colspan="3" style="background:#E8FFD8;"|Replays

|}
Source: irishfa.com

Quarter-finals
The quarter-finals were played on 3 March 2012, with the replay played on 12 March 2012.

†Ballymena United were later ejected from the competition for fielding an ineligible player in this match. Newry City were consequently reinstated. Ballymena United appealed the decision, but the appeal was rejected.

Replay

Semi-finals
The semi-final draw was made on 3 March 2012. Both ties were due to be played on 31 March 2012. However, Ballymena United's appeal over their disqualification delayed Linfield's semi-final match until 14 April 2012. Newry City were confirmed as their opponents when Ballymena's appeal was rejected.

Final
The final took place on 5 May 2012 at Windsor Park.

References

External links
 Official site
 nifootball.co.uk

2011-12
Cup
2011–12 domestic association football cups